Coldridge or Coleridge is a village and parish in Devon, England. It appears in the Doomsday Book as Colrige which is thought to mean 'the ridge where charcoal is made. It has a church dedicated to St Matthew dating from the 15th and early 16th century which is a Grade I listed building.

In 2021, investigations started as to whether John Evans, a mediaeval lord of the manor buried in the church, may in reality have been the missing Edward V, one of the princes in the Tower, whose mother Elizabeth Woodville travelled to Devon in 1484 and whose son Thomas Grey owned land at Coldridge.  The church contains an unusual stained glass portrait of Edward V, and other alleged clues.  The investigations have been set up by writer and historian Philippa Langley, and follow suggestions originally made in the 1920s by local historian Beatrix Cresswell.

References

Villages in Mid Devon District
Civil parishes in Devon